Amey may refer to:

 Amey plc, a UK infrastructure support company, subsidiary of the Spanish company Grupo Ferrovial

People
 Colin Amey, Canadian singer
 Jessica Amey (born 1976), Canadian swimmer
 Otis Amey (born 1981), American footballer
 William Amey (1881–1940), English soldier and recipient of the Victoria Cross
 Wisdom Amey (born 2005), Italian footballer